The hedonic treadmill, also known as hedonic adaptation, is the observed tendency of humans to quickly return to a relatively stable level of happiness despite major positive or negative events or life changes.
According to this theory, as a person makes more money, expectations and desires rise in tandem, which results in no permanent gain in happiness. Philip Brickman and Donald T. Campbell coined the term in their essay "Hedonic Relativism and Planning the Good Society" (1971). The hedonic treadmill viewpoint suggests that wealth does not increase the level of happiness.

Overview
Hedonic adaptation is a process or mechanism that reduces the affective impact of emotional events. Generally, hedonic adaptation involves a happiness "set point", whereby humans generally maintain a constant level of happiness throughout their lives, despite events that occur in their environment. The process of hedonic adaptation is often conceptualized as a treadmill, since no matter how hard one tries to gain an increase in happiness, one will remain in the same place.

Hedonic adaptation can occur in a variety of ways. Generally, the process involves cognitive changes, such as shifting values, goals, attention and interpretation of a situation. Further, neurochemical processes desensitize overstimulated hedonic pathways in the brain, which possibly prevents persistently high levels of intense positive or negative feelings. The process of adaptation can also occur through the tendency of humans to construct elaborate rationales for considering themselves deprived through a process social theorist Gregg Easterbrook calls "abundance denial".

Major theoretical approaches

Behavioral/psychological approach
"Hedonic treadmill" is a term coined by Brickman and Campbell in their article, "Hedonic Relativism and Planning the Good Society" (1971), describing the tendency of people to keep a fairly stable baseline level of happiness despite external events and fluctuations in demographic circumstances. The idea of relative happiness had been around for decades when in 1978 Brickman, et al., began to approach hedonic pleasure within the framework of Helson's adaptation level theory, which holds that perception of stimulation is dependent upon comparison of former stimulations. The hedonic treadmill functions similarly to most adaptations that serve to protect and enhance perception. In the case of hedonics, the sensitization or desensitization to circumstances or environment can redirect motivation. This reorientation functions to protect against complacency, but also to accept unchangeable circumstances, and redirect efforts towards more effective goals. Frederick and Lowenstein classify three types of processes in hedonic adaptation: shifting adaptation levels, desensitization, and sensitization. Shifting adaptation levels occurs when a person experiences a shift in what is perceived as a "neutral" stimulus, but maintains sensitivity to stimulus differences. For example, if Sam gets a raise he will initially be happier, and then habituate to the larger salary and return to his happiness set point. But he will still be pleased when he gets a holiday bonus. Desensitization decreases sensitivity in general, which reduces sensitivity to change. Those who have lived in war zones for extended periods of time may become desensitized to the destruction that happens on a daily basis, and be less affected by the occurrence of serious injuries or losses that may once have been shocking and upsetting. Sensitization is an increase of hedonic response from continuous exposure, such as the increased pleasure and selectivity of connoisseurs for wine, or food.

Brickman, Coates, and Janoff-Bulman were among the first to investigate the hedonic treadmill in their 1978 study, "Lottery Winners and Accident Victims: Is Happiness Relative?". Lottery winners and paraplegics were compared to a control group and as predicted, comparison (with past experiences and current communities) and habituation (to new circumstances) affected levels of happiness such that after the initial impact of the extremely positive or negative events, happiness levels typically went back to the average levels. This interview-based study, while not longitudinal, was the beginning of a now large body of work exploring the relativity of happiness.

Brickman and Campbell originally implied that everyone returns to the same neutral set point after a significantly emotional life event. In the literature review, "Beyond the Hedonic Treadmill, Revising the Adaptation Theory of Well-Being" (2006), Diener, Lucas, and Scollon concluded that people are not hedonically neutral, and that individuals have different set points which are at least partially heritable. They also concluded that individuals may have more than one happiness set point, such as a life satisfaction set point and a subjective well-being set point, and that because of this, one's level of happiness is not just one given set point but can vary within a given range. Diener and colleagues point to longitudinal and cross-sectional research to argue that happiness set point can change, and lastly that individuals vary in the rate and extent of adaptation they exhibit to change in circumstance.

Empirical studies
In a longitudinal study conducted by Mancini, Bonnano, and Clark, people showed individual differences in how they responded to significant life events, such as marriage, divorce and widowhood. They recognized that some individuals do experience substantial changes to their hedonic set point over time, though most others do not, and argue that happiness set point can be relatively stable throughout the course of an individual's life, but the life satisfaction and subjective well-being set points are more variable.

Similarly, the longitudinal study conducted by Fujita and Diener (2005) described the life satisfaction set point as a "soft baseline". This means that for most people, this baseline is similar to their happiness baseline. Typically, life satisfaction will hover around a set point for the majority of their lives and not change dramatically. However, for about a quarter of the population this set point is not stable, and does indeed move in response to a major life event.
Other longitudinal data has shown that subjective well-being set points do change over time, and that adaptation is not necessarily inevitable. In his archival data analysis, Lucas found evidence that it is possible for someone's subjective well-being set point to change drastically, such as in the case of individuals who acquire a severe, long term disability. However, as Diener, Lucas, and Scollon point out, the amount of fluctuation a person experiences around their set point is largely dependent on the individual's ability to adapt.

After following over a thousand sets of twins for 10 years, Lykken and Tellegen (1996) concluded that almost 50% of our happiness levels are determined by genetics. Headey and Wearing (1989) suggested that our position on the spectrum of the stable personality traits (neuroticism, extraversion, and openness to experience) accounts for how we experience and perceive life events, and indirectly contributes to our happiness levels. Research on happiness has spanned decades and crossed cultures in order to test the true limits of our hedonic set point.

In large panel studies, divorce, death of a spouse, unemployment, disability, and similar events have been shown to change the long-term subjective well-being, even though some adaptation does occur and inborn factors affect this.

In the aforementioned Brickman study (1978), researchers interviewed 22 lottery winners and 29 paraplegics to determine their change in happiness levels due to their given event (winning lottery or becoming paralyzed). The event in the case of lottery winners had taken place between one month and one and a half years before the study, and in the case of paraplegics between a month and a year. The group of lottery winners reported being similarly happy before and after the event, and expected to have a similar level of happiness in a couple of years. These findings show that having a large monetary gain had no effect on their baseline level of happiness, for both present and expected happiness in the future. They found that the paraplegics reported having a higher level of happiness in the past than the rest (due to a nostalgia effect), a lower level of happiness at the time of the study than the rest (although still above the middle point of the scale, that is, they reported being more happy than unhappy) and, surprisingly, they also expected to have similar levels of happiness than the rest in a couple of years. One must note that the paraplegics did have an initial decrease in life happiness, but the key to their findings is that they expected to eventually return to their baseline in time.

In a newer study (2007), winning a medium-sized lottery prize had a lasting mental wellbeing effect of 1.4 GHQ points on Britons even two years after the event.
 
Some research suggests that resilience to suffering is partly due to a decreased fear response in the amygdala and increased levels of BDNF in the brain. New genetic research have found that changing a gene could increase intelligence and resilience to depressing and traumatizing events. This could have crucial benefits for those with anxiety and PTSD. 
 
Recent research reveals certain types of brain training can increase brain size. The hippocampus volume can affect mood, hedonic setpoints, and some forms of memory. A smaller hippocampus has been linked to depression and dysthymia. Certain activities and environmental factors can reset the hedonic setpoint and also grow the hippocampus to an extent. London taxi drivers' hippocampi grow on the job, and the drivers have a better memory than those who did not become taxi drivers. In particular, the posterior hippocampus seemed to be the most important for enhanced mood and memory.

Lucas, Clark, Georgellis, and Diener (2003) researched changes in baseline level of well-being due to changes in marital status, the birth of first child, and the loss of employment. While they found that a negative life event can have a greater impact on a person's psychological state and happiness set point than a positive event, they concluded that people completely adapt, finally returning to their baseline level of well-being, after divorce, losing a spouse, the birth of a child, and for women losing their job. They did not find a return to baseline for marriage or for layoffs in men. This study also illustrated that the amount of adaptation depends on the individual.

Wildeman, Turney, and Schnittker (2014) studied the effects of imprisonment on one's baseline level of well-being. They researched how being in jail affects one's level of happiness both short term (while in prison) and long term (after being released). They found that being in prison has negative effects on one's baseline well-being; in other words one's baseline of happiness is lower in prison than when not in prison. Once people were released from prison, they were able to bounce back to their previous level of happiness.

Silver (1982) researched the effects of a traumatic accident on one's baseline level of happiness. Silver found that accident victims were able to return to a happiness set point after a period of time. For eight weeks, Silver followed accident victims who had sustained severe spinal cord injuries. About a week after their accident, Silver observed that the victims were experiencing much stronger negative emotions than positive ones. By the eighth and final week, the victims' positive emotions outweighed their negative ones. The results of this study suggest that regardless of whether the life event is significantly negative or positive, people will almost always return to their happiness baseline.

Fujita and Diener (2005) studied the stability of one's level of subjective well-being over time and found that for most people, there is a relatively small range in which their level of satisfaction varies. They asked a panel of 3,608 German residents to rate their current and overall satisfaction with life on a scale of 0–10, once a year for seventeen years. Only 25% of participants exhibited shifts in their level of life satisfaction over the course of the study, with just 9% of participants having experienced significant changes. They also found that those with a higher mean level of life satisfaction had more stable levels of life satisfaction than those with lower levels of satisfaction.

Applications

Happiness set point
The concept of the happiness set point (proposed by Sonja Lyubomirsky) can be applied in clinical psychology to help patients return to their hedonic set point when negative events happen. Determining when someone is mentally distant from their happiness set point and what events trigger those changes can be extremely helpful in treating conditions such as depression. When a change occurs, clinical psychologists work with patients to recover from the depressive spell and return to their hedonic set point more quickly. Because acts of kindness often promote long-term well-being, one treatment method is to provide patients with different altruistic activities that can help a person raise his or her hedonic set point. This can in turn be helpful in reducing reckless habits in the pursuit of well-being. Further, helping patients understand that long-term happiness is relatively stable throughout one's life can help to ease anxiety surrounding impactful events.

Resilience research
Hedonic adaptation is also relevant to resilience research. Resilience is a "class of phenomena characterized by patterns of positive adaptation in the context of significant adversity or risk," meaning that resilience is largely the ability for one to remain at their hedonic setpoint while going through negative experiences. Psychologists have identified various factors that contribute to a person being resilient, such as positive attachment relationships (see Attachment Theory), positive self-perceptions, self-regulatory skills (see Emotional self-regulation), ties to prosocial organizations (see prosocial behavior), and a positive outlook on life.

Critical views
One critical point made regarding humans’ individual set point is to understand it may simply be a genetic tendency and not a completely determined criterion for happiness, and it can still be influenced. In a study on moderate to excessive drug intake on rats, Ahmed and Koob (1998) sought to demonstrate that the use of mind-altering drugs such as cocaine could change an individual's hedonic set point. Their findings suggest that drug usage and addiction lead to neurochemical adaptations whereby a person needs more of that substance to feel the same levels of pleasure. Thus, drug abuse can have lasting impacts on one's hedonic set point, both in terms of overall happiness and with regard to pleasure felt from drug usage.

Genetic roots of the hedonic set point are also disputed. Sosis (2014) has argued the "hedonic treadmill" interpretation of twin studies depends on dubious assumptions. Pairs of identical twins raised apart are not necessarily raised in substantially different environments. The similarities between twins (such as intelligence or beauty) may invoke similar reactions from the environment. Thus, we might see a notable similarity in happiness levels between twins even though there are no happiness genes governing affect levels.

Further, hedonic adaptation may be a more common phenomenon when dealing with positive events as opposed to negative ones. Negativity bias, where people tend to focus more on negative emotions than positive emotions, can be an obstacle in raising one's happiness set point. Negative emotions often require more attention and are generally remembered better, overshadowing any positive experiences that may even outnumber negative experiences. Given that negative events hold more psychological power than positive ones, it may be difficult to create lasting positive change.

Headey (2008) concluded that an internal locus of control and having "positive" personality traits (notably low neuroticism) are the two most significant factors affecting one's subjective well-being. Headey also found that adopting "non-zero sum" goals, those which enrich one's relationships with others and with society as a whole (i.e. family-oriented and altruistic goals), increase the level of subjective well-being. Conversely, attaching importance to zero-sum life goals (career success, wealth, and social status) will have a small but nevertheless statistically significant negative impact on people's overall subjective well-being (even though the size of a household's disposable income does have a small, positive impact on subjective well-being). Duration of one's education seems to have no direct bearing on life satisfaction. And, contradicting set point theory, Headey found no return to homeostasis after sustaining a disability or developing a chronic illness. These disabling events are permanent, and thus according to cognitive model of depression, may contribute to depressive thoughts and increase neuroticism (another factor found by Headey to diminish subjective well-being). Disability appears to be the single most important factor affecting human subjective well-being. The impact of disability on subjective well-being is almost twice as large as that of the second strongest factor affecting life satisfaction -— the personality trait of neuroticism.

See also
Biohappiness
Epicureanism
Giffen good
Happiness economics
Induced demand
Leisure satisfaction
Lifestyle creep
Opponent-process theory
Paradox of hedonism
Positivity offset
Say's law
Snackwell effect

References

Further reading
 

 The Overspent American: Why We Want What We Don't Need by Juliet B. Schor

Wealth
Hedonism
Happiness
Positive psychology
Suffering